Swastika is a 1973 British documentary film by Philippe Mora. It was shown at that year's Cannes Film Festival which nearly caused a riot.

Summary
A study of Nazism and the private lives of Adolf Hitler and his wife Eva Braun through newsreel clips, pre-war propaganda, documentary material and even Eva's color home movies.

Home media
It was released by Kino Lorber on DVD on June 16, 2012.

See also
 Gone with the Wind, an Oscar-winning 1939 American epic romance war film mentioned in the documentary
 Triumph of the Will, a 1935 Nazi propaganda film by Leni Riefenstahl
 List of banned films

References

External links

Official trailer
Viennale

Collage film
1973 films
British documentary films
1973 documentary films
Documentary films about Adolf Hitler
Films directed by Philippe Mora
Documentary films about Nazis
1970s British films